Mateusz Kościukiewicz (born 1 May 1986 in Nowy Tomyśl) is a Polish film actor.

Life and career
He grew up in Nowy Tomyśl, where he attended the General and Post-Secondary Schools. He studied at the Kraków State Higher Theater School.

In 2010 he received the Karlovy Vary Film Festival Award for the best actor (with Filip Garbacz) for the role in Paweł Sala's film Matka Teresa od kotów. In the same year he won Zbigniew Cybulski Award.

In 2011 he received an Eagle in category "Discovery of Year" for the role in All That I Love. He was also nominated in category "Best Actor".

In 2013 Mateusz Kościukiewicz was named one of the 10 most promising acting talents in Europe in EFP's Shooting Star 2014 showcase.

He has been married to director Malgorzata Szumowska since 2011. They have one daughter Alina born on 3 December 2012.

In January 2020 The Informer were released in the US cinemas where Kościukiewicz plays Stazek in his first "Hollywood" role.

Selected filmography 
List of films:
 2009: Sweet Rush
 2009: All That I Love as Janek
 2010: Mother Teresa of Cats as Artur 
 2011: Sala samobójców as Jasper (voice)
 2012: Shameless as Tadek
 2013: Bejbi blues as Seba 
 2013: Baczyński as Krzysztof Kamil Baczyński
 2013: In the Name Of as "Dynia" Lukasz
 2013: Walesa. Man of Hope as Krzysiek
 2013: Bilet na Księżyc as Antoni Sikora 
 2015: 11 Minutes as ex-boyfriend
 2015: Disco Polo - co-screenwriter 
 2015: Panie Dulskie as Zbyniu 
 2015: Elixir as Louis 
 2015: Francesco as Francis of Assisi
 2017: Amok as Krystian Bala
 2017: Gwiazdy as Jan Banaś
 2017: Breaking the Limits as Andrzej
 2018: Mug as Jacek
 2018: Diagnosis (TVN series) as Prosecutor Paweł Wilecki
 2018: 1983 (Netflix series) as Kamil Zatoń
 2019: Solid Gold as Solarz
 2019: Żużel as Riczi
 2020: The Informer as Staszek
 2020: Eagle. Last Patrol as Lieutenant Andrzej Piasecki

See also
Polish cinema
Polish Film Awards

References 

1986 births
Polish male film actors
Living people
21st-century Polish male actors